Samih Madhoun, also transliterated Samih al-Madhoun and Sameh Alamdhon (Arabic: سميح المدهون) was a senior leader of the Al-Aqsa Martyrs Brigade, an armed group affiliated with the Palestinian political party Fatah. He was killed on 14 June 2007 in Nuseirat refugee camp in the central Gaza Strip by the al-Qassam Brigades, the military wing of the Hamas movement.

References

External links
  (video removed)
 
 
 . The video includes reenacted discussions and voice over of secret meetings between Arab, Israeli and US officials, supposedly photographed with a hidden video camera, and planning Madhoun's assassination together.  
 
 video about his life

2007 deaths
Year of birth missing
Fatah military commanders
Fatah–Hamas conflict